Graeme Williamson is a former Australian rules footballer, who played for the Fitzroy Football Club in the Victorian Football League (VFL).

Career
Williamson played four games for Fitzroy in the 1984 season, before returning in the 1986 season to play five more.

References

External links

1964 births
Living people
Fitzroy Football Club players
Colac Football Club players
Australian rules footballers from Victoria (Australia)